Olivia Marie Athens (born August 1, 1998) is an American professional soccer player who plays as a midfielder for OL Reign of the National Women's Soccer League (NWSL).

Early life
Born in Stanford, California and raised in nearby Atherton, Athens attended Sacred Heart Prep where she played soccer for two seasons. During her time with the varsity team, she scored 33 goals and provided 30 assists. She earned first-team all-league honors the first year and was named the league's Forward of the Year the second. She played club soccer for PSV Union FC 98G and won the 2014 Surf Cup.

College career

UCLA Bruins, 2017–2021
Athens attended UCLA where she played for the UCLA Bruins from 2017–21.  During her freshman season in 2017, Athens was a started in 12 of the 23 games she played, including six 2017 NCAA College Cup games. Her first goal was a game-winner against Princeton in the NCAA College Cup quarterfinals. She was named to Top Drawer Soccer's Team of the Week in late November. The Bruins advanced to the final of the College Cup where they were defeated 3–2 by the Stanford Cardinal.

During the 2018 season, Athens ranked third on the Bruins in scoring with four goals, including two game-winners and 16 points. Her eight assists ranked second on the team. She was a starting midfielder in 20 starts of the 22 games she played, including all four 2018 NCAA College Cup games where the team advanced to the quarterfinals and were defeated in a penalty kick shootout by the North Carolina Tar Heels. Athens earned honorable mention Pac-12 All-Academic honors. In 2019, Athens's season was cut short by a fractured leg injury. Returning in 2020, Athens was a starting midfield in 16 of the 17 games she played, scored four goals and provided eight assists for a total of 16 points. She was named Pac-12 Offensive Player of the Week and earned CoSIDA Academic All-District first-team honors. In her final season with the Bruins, Athens was a starter in all 19 games she played. Her four goals and ten points ranked third on the team. Both of the assists she provided were on game-winning goals.

Athens finished her collegiate career with 12 goals and 15 assists in the 85 games she played.

Club career

OL Reign, 2022–
OL Reign signed Athens in January 2022 ahead of the 2022 season. She made her professional debut for the club in a match against Angel City FC on March 26, 2022. On July 10, 2022, she scored her first professional goal against Portland Thorns FC in her first professional start. Athens finished her rookie season with eight appearances and one goal. The Reign finished in first place and won the NWSL Shield and advanced to the NWSL Playoffs.

Honors
 with OL Reign
 NWSL Shield: 2022
 The Women's Cup: 2022

References

External links 
 
 UCLA profile
 

UCLA Bruins women's soccer players
OL Reign players
Living people
American women's soccer players
People from Atherton, California
Women's association football midfielders
1998 births
National Women's Soccer League players